Abby Lee may refer to:
 Abby Lee (born 1972), author of Girl with a One-Track Mind
 Abby Lee Miller (born 1966), American dance instructor and choreographer
 Abbey Lee (born 1987), Australian fashion model, actress and musician
 Abby Lee (politician), member of the Idaho State Senate

See also 
 Abby Leigh (born 1948), American artist
 Lee Abbey, Devon, England
 Abby (disambiguation)
 Lee (disambiguation)